Tim Scanlan is a musician from Melbourne, Australia who performs as a one-man band. This multi-instrumentalist simultaneously plays a harmonica, a guitar and rattling shaker (left-handed), a bass drum or cajon with his right foot, and cymbals on a stand with his left foot while tapping his feet on a stomp box. He also sings occasionally. His unique style of music has been described as a blend of Blues, Jazz, Folk, Roots Music and Reggae.

Early life 
Scanlan was born on 15 May 1979.

Achievements 
Winner of the 2017 Tamworth Country Music Festival Busking Competition 
Took second place at the 2012 Anglo-Celt Street Seisiún Talent Competition.
Has performed in several countries, including Australia, the United States, Canada, Ireland and Japan.
Records on the indie label Scanbait Records. His music is also featured on MySpace and Soundcloud.
Featured as the main subject of over a dozen YouTube videos.

Collaborations 
Scanlan and Japanese percussionist, Toshi Bodhran, tour extensively in Japan and Australia. Together, they released the CD "Come n Take a Look".

Scanlan, along with Irishmen Aindrias de Staic and former Saw Doctors drummer, Éimhín Cradock, played together as the Gaelic hip-hop band, The Latchikós in 2013. They performed live at music festivals in Canada, Ireland and the United States. They also produced one 10-track CD.

Discography

Albums
 Tim Scanlan - Japan Tour (2013)
 Come n Take a Look [with Toshi Bodhran] (2013)
 A Minor Key [4 track EP] (2015)
 Tim Scanlan & Friends - Live in Tokyo [with Mana Okubo & Rhys Crimmin] (2016) <https://rateyourmusic.com/release/album/tim-scanlan/live-in-tokyo/>

References

External links

 

Australian multi-instrumentalists
Australian songwriters
Australian guitarists
Australian buskers
One-man bands
Australian harmonica players
Living people
1979 births
21st-century Australian singers
21st-century guitarists
21st-century Australian male singers
Australian male guitarists